Birger Joseph Nordholm (June 25, 1897 – November 30, 1989), was a Swedish-American founding director of the Swedish National Tourist Office in New York City, and the first Chairman of the European Travel Commission.

Biography 
Birger Nordholm was born in 1897 in Stockholm, Sweden, and grew up in Östermalm where he studied at Östra Real.

Birger Nordholm devoted his career to the promotion of tourism and international relations between Sweden, the United States and Europe. During Nordholm's lifetime, tourism in Sweden expanded into one of the nation's main revenue source, and Nordholm was a keen promoter of its transatlantic development.

Nordholm initiated and headed the Swedish National Tourist Office 1921–1963, located in the Rockefeller Center in New York City, United States. He went on to serve as Managing Director for the Swedish State Railways Travel Information Agency as well as the Swedish-American Chamber of Commerce in New York City, and was a lifelong member of the Scandinavian Travel Commission.

After World War II, as part of the Marshall Plan, Nordholm was appointed the initial Chairman (1949–1958) of the European Travel Commission by President Dwight D. Eisenhower. In addition, he was appointed President of the Conference of European Railroad Representatives.

Following the simplification of visa regulations, customs procedures, and other formalities, as expressed in a 1952 edition of the This Week magazine, Birger Nordholm together with Arthur Haulot foregrounded the "purposeful" and "educational" dimension of "a new type of tourism" that would be "the foundation of lasting peace". This would eventually contribute to the development of the OECD Tourism Committee.

Nordholm's residences in New York City and Weston, Connecticut, would become centers of international festivities, including annual Midsummer celebrations held at his country house "Tuckaway", attended by ambassadors, consular heads, the press, Miss Sweden and other dignitaries, as well as friends and neighbours, and Nordholm became a well-known international speaker.

He died in 1989 in Raleigh, Wake County, North Carolina, United States, with ashes buried at his country house "Tuckaway" in Connecticut.

Charities 

Birger Nordholm promoted philanthropy to various international charities, such as to the humanitarian aid organization Finnish Relief Fund with purpose to assist civilians of Finland during the Winter War of World War II. He assisted cultural institutions such as the American Museum of Natural History, and was a member of the Swedish Pioneer Historical Society, and the American Swedish Historical Foundation behind the American Swedish Historical Museum.

Nordholm was also a "Founding Father" and "skålleage" of the North American charter of the Skål International in New York City on 1 April 1938, with the objective to "develop true friendship and common purpose among members of the tourist industry; through tourism, to promote mutual understanding and foster goodwill between the peoples of the world."

The Birger Nordholm Foundation (Swedish: Birger Nordholms stiftelse) was posthumously established at his former secondary school Östra Real in Östermalm, Stockholm. Maintained by the Alumni Association of the school of which Nordholm was a lifelong member, it awards students who have "demonstrated a good and exemplary companionship or else by significant efforts have shown great interest in the school and its activities."

Distinctions 
  Knight of the Order of the Polar Star (1952)
  Knight 1st class of the Order of Vasa (1939)
  Knight of the Order of the Dannebrog (1955)
  Knight of the Order of the White Rose of Finland
  Order of Merit of Tourism (1959)
  St. Olav's Medal
  Key to the City of New York City (1987)
  Nordholm Drive, road to his country house in Weston, Connecticut (1950s)

External links 
 European Travel Commission 
 Swedish-American Chamber of Commerce

References

1897 births
1989 deaths
20th-century Swedish businesspeople
Businesspeople from Stockholm
Businesspeople from New York City
Businesspeople from Connecticut
People from Weston, Connecticut
20th-century philanthropists
20th-century American businesspeople
American transportation businesspeople
American entertainment industry businesspeople
Swedish emigrants to the United States
American chief executives of travel and tourism industry companies
American chief operating officers
American railroad executives
Swedish civil servants
Chairpersons of non-governmental organizations
Swedish public relations people
Swedish philanthropists
Tourism in Sweden
Knights of the Order of the Polar Star
Knights of the Order of Vasa
Knights of the Order of the Dannebrog
Recipients of the St. Olav's Medal